Lammual Stadium is a football stadium located in Aizawl, Mizoram, India. It is used mainly for football matches. It was one of the venues for the Northeast Games 2012. The stadium is used for playing Mizoram Premier League matches.

Stadium
The ground is a single tier stadium. The stadium has a seating capacity of about 5,000 spectators, which costed around 190 crores.

History
Lammual was started in the 1920s due to lack of level ground in Mizoram for troops to practice and it was decided to flatten a knoll to create a Parade ground. It took 5 years of Military labor under Loch's battalion to complete the ground. The cost of leveling the ground at that time was Rs 1,200. When the work was completed, the parade ground had a sheer cliff of 60 feet on side and 150 feet of filling in on the other. The cliff face of this field.

Modern
The stadium has a historical and cultural significance for the Mizo people. It has been used for addressing the people of Mizoram by politicians like Jawaharlal Nehru who visited Aizawl in 1965. Lammual has also been the place where a helicopter landed for the first time in Mizoram in 1962.   It is the venue for Chapchar Kut festival, a festival of Mizo people. There was initially a plan to construct the Rajiv Gandhi Stadium in Lammual ground  before it was shifted to Mualpui as Assam Rifle could not give clearance for construction. The Chief Minister of Mizoram, Lal Thanhawla officially inaugurated the artificial turf (grass) laid at Aizawl Lammual, also known as the Assam Rifles (AR) Ground in Aizawl city on Monday, 28 February 2011. The stadium has flood light facilities.

References 

Aizawl
Football venues in Mizoram
Sports venues in Mizoram
Aizawl FC
Sports venues completed in 1928
1928 establishments in India
20th-century architecture in India